Andrew Geoffrey Macnish (born 11 September 1965) is a business consultant, and former Australian rules footballer who played with the West Coast Eagles and Geelong in the VFL/AFL.

Macnish was a Western Australian and his early football was played with Subiaco. He represented his state in the 1986 State of Origin Carnival where, still at 20 years of age, he impressed enough to be included in the All-Australian team, performing particularly well in the Sandgroper's 137 to 134 win against Victoria and being remembered for a big mark and latter goal in the hectic last quarter.

West Coast recruited Macnish for their inaugural season in 1987 and he kicked three goals on debut in the opening round against Richmond at Subiaco Oval. On the same ground in round 22 he kicked a career best five goals in a convincing win over St Kilda. After multiple injuries and not playing a game for West Coast in 1988 he returned to action at the end of the following year but it would be his last game for the club. He was sidelined again with injury and stayed on the West Coast list until the end of 1991, after which he nominated for the mid-season draft.  He finished his AFL career in Victoria with Geelong in the second half of 1992 but could only break into the successful senior side for three of the final four home and away games.  He did kick five goals in the second last game against Brisbane and gained top Brownlow votes in a best afield performance. Macnish trained with Geelong's finals squad without being selected and was subsequently informed his contract would not be renewed.  He returned to Perth with his wife and two young children to have two more and complete his career with Subiaco Football Club.

During his VFL career, Macnish gained a civil engineering degree and when the VFL became the AFL, graduated with his master's degree in Business Administration in March 1991 (possibly making him the first AFL player to do so).  Following his football career, Macnish was CEO at the Shire of Bridgetown from 1998 - 2003, CEO at Busselton from 2003-2010 and has since held executive business roles.  He completed three more tertiary qualifications including another master's degree (in Sustainability Management) and now consults.

References

Holmesby, Russell and Main, Jim (2007). The Encyclopedia of AFL Footballers. 7th ed. Melbourne: Bas Publishing.

1965 births
Living people
West Coast Eagles players
Geelong Football Club players
Subiaco Football Club players
Western Australian State of Origin players
All-Australians (1953–1988)
Australian rules footballers from Western Australia